SS Douglas  may refer to the following four ships:

 : a paddle-steamer of the Isle of Man Steam Packet Company which subsequently became a blockade runner for the Confederate Navy during the American Civil War under the name Margaret & Jessie, before being taken as "prize" and serving in the Union Navy as the USS Gettysburg.
 : the second steamer in the fleet of the Isle of Man Steam Packet Company to bear the name.
 : originally a packet steamer of the London and Southwestern Railway named Dora. Acquired by the Isle of Man Steam Packet Company in 1901 and re-named Douglas.
 : a freight vessel built for the Clyde Shipbuilding and Engineering in Port Glasgow for Goole Steam Shipping Company.

Ship names